The 2000 AFL Ansett Australia Cup was the Australian Football League pre-season Cup competition played in its entirety before the Australian Football League's 2000 Premiership Season began.

Unlike most pre-season cup competitions that start in February, the 2000 Cup started on 31 December 1999 with a one-off Match of the Millennium between Carlton and Collingwood, most notable for the competition record 12 goals by Brendan Fevola.  The competition culminated with the Grand Final in February 2000 between Essendon, the eventual 2000 AFL Premiers, and the Kangaroos, the reigning 1999 AFL Premiers.  Essendon's undefeated run through the pre-season was a precursor to their dominance in the premiership season, in which they only lost one match.  The final was held in February, rather than March as per most other pre-seasons, due to the season being played earlier in the year so that the finals would not clash with the 2000 Summer Olympics to be held in Sydney in late September.

Group stage

Group A

|- bgcolor="#CCCCFF"
|Home team||Home team score||Away team||Away team score||Ground||Crowd||Date
|- bgcolor="#FFFFFF"
|  || 13.6 (84) ||  || 17.10 (112) || Bundaberg Rum Stadium || 8,818 || Friday, 28 January
|- bgcolor="#FFFFFF"
|  || 10.16 (76) ||  || 9.11 (65) || Waverley Park || 16,512 || Friday, 28 January
|- bgcolor="#FFFFFF"
|  || 11.16 (82) ||  || 15.9 (99) || North Hobart Oval || 4,908 || Saturday, 5 February
|- bgcolor="#FFFFFF"
|  || 13.11 (89) ||  || 17.10 (112) || Manuka Oval || 9,854 || Saturday, 5 February
|- bgcolor="#FFFFFF"
|  || 11.8 (74) ||  || 10.8 (64) || Waverley Park || 6,518 || Friday, 11 February
|- bgcolor="#FFFFFF"
|  || 12.14 (86) ||  || 12.11 (83) || Manuka Oval || 8,714 || Saturday, 12 February

Group B

|- bgcolor="#CCCCFF"
|Home team||Home team score||Away team||Away team score||Ground||Crowd||Date
|- bgcolor="#FFFFFF"
|  || 20.17 (137) ||  || 7.7 (49) || M.C.G. || 16,678 || Friday, 31 December 1999
|- bgcolor="#FFFFFF"
|  || 13.12 (90) ||  || 12.9 (81) || Football Park || 10,454 || Saturday, 29 January
|- bgcolor="#FFFFFF"
|  || 22.14 (146) ||  || 9.8 (62) || Waverley Park || 5,692 || Saturday, 29 January
|- bgcolor="#FFFFFF"
|  || 10.18 (78) ||  || 10.9 (69) || Subiaco Oval || 6,119 || Saturday, 5 February
|- bgcolor="#FFFFFF"
|  || 12.8 (80) ||  || 11.10 (76) || Football Park || 11,132 || Saturday, 12 February
|- bgcolor="#FFFFFF"
|  || 13.14 (92) ||  || 3.11 (29) || Waverley Park || 7,752 || Saturday, 12 February

Group C

|- bgcolor="#CCCCFF"
|Home team||Home team score||Away team||Away team score||Ground||Crowd||Date
|- bgcolor="#FFFFFF"
|  || 17.5 (107) ||  || 19.11 (125) || Football Park || 12,239 || Sunday, 30 January
|- bgcolor="#FFFFFF"
|  || 10.14 (74) ||  || 11.12 (78) || Waverley Park || 7,394 || Sunday, 30 January
|- bgcolor="#FFFFFF"
|  || 9.12 (66) ||  || 13.14 (92) || Waverley Park || 10,533 || Saturday, 5 February
|- bgcolor="#FFFFFF"
|  || 19.10 (124) ||  || 15.12 (102) || Football Park || 11,326 || Sunday, 6 February
|- bgcolor="#FFFFFF"
|  || 14.11 (95) ||  || 15.12 (102) || Football Park || 13,086 || Sunday, 13 February
|- bgcolor="#FFFFFF"
|  || 17.12 (114) ||  || 11.16 (82) || Waverley Park || 4,952 || Monday, 14 February

Group D

|- bgcolor="#CCCCFF"
|Home team||Home team score||Away team||Away team score||Ground||Crowd||Date
|- bgcolor="#FFFFFF"
|  || 8.10 (58) ||  || 11.12 (78) || Marrara Oval || 13,600 || Friday, 28 January
|- bgcolor="#FFFFFF"
|  || 4.14 (38) ||  || 13.7 (85) || Westpac Stadium, Wellington, New Zealand || 11,666 || Saturday, 29 January
|- bgcolor="#FFFFFF"
|  || 17.12 (114) ||  || 10.21 (81) || Waverley Park || 11,391 || Friday, 4 February
|- bgcolor="#FFFFFF"
|  || 17.14 (116) ||  || 5.10 (40) || Waverley Park || 6,872 || Sunday, 6 February
|- bgcolor="#FFFFFF"
|  || 19.15 (129) ||  || 12.10 (82) || Subiaco Oval || 9,285 || Saturday, 12 February
|- bgcolor="#FFFFFF"
|  || 10.16 (76) ||  || 19.11 (125) || Waverley Park || 15,081 || Sunday, 13 February

Semi finals

|- bgcolor="#CCCCFF"
|Home team||Home team score||Away team||Away team score||Ground||Crowd||Date
|- bgcolor="#FFFFFF"
|  || 13.19 (97) ||  || 11.10 (76) || Waverley Park || 12,641 || Friday, 18 February
|- bgcolor="#FFFFFF"
|  || 16.9 (105) ||  || 19.17 (131) || Waverley Park || 16,384 || Saturday, 19 February

Grand final

|- bgcolor="#CCCCFF"
|Home team||Home team score||Away team||Away team score||Ground||Crowd||Date||Time||
|- bgcolor="#FFFFFF"
|  || 11.10 (76) ||  || 16.21 (117) || M.C.G. || 56,720 || Saturday, 26 February || 7:10 pm || |

See also

List of Australian Football League night premiers
2000 AFL season

References

2000 Australian Football League season
Ansett Australia Cup, 2000
Australian Football League pre-season competition